Mevalonic acid (MVA) is a key organic compound in biochemistry; the name is a contraction of dihydroxymethylvalerolactone.  The carboxylate anion of mevalonic acid, which is the predominant form in biological environments, is known as mevalonate and is of major pharmaceutical importance. Drugs like statins (which lower levels of cholesterol) stop the production of mevalonate by inhibiting HMG-CoA reductase.

Chemistry
Mevalonic acid is very soluble in water and polar organic solvents.  It exists in equilibrium with its lactone form, called mevalonolactone, that is formed by internal condensation of its terminal alcohol and carboxylic acid functional groups.

Biology
Mevalonic acid is a precursor in the biosynthetic pathway known as the mevalonate pathway that produces terpenes and steroids. Mevalonic acid is the primary precursor of isopentenyl pyrophosphate (IPP), that is in turn the basis for all terpenoids. Mevalonic acid is chiral and the (3R)-enantiomer is the only one that is biologically active.

References

Beta hydroxy acids
Diols